Joseph Jean-Paul Robert Rousseau (born July 26, 1940) is a Canadian former professional ice hockey right winger who played in the National Hockey League (NHL), most notably for the Montreal Canadiens. He won the Calder Memorial Trophy in 1962 as NHL rookie of the year.

Playing career

Early career
Rousseau started his career with the St. Jean Braves of the Quebec Junior Hockey League in 1955-56 where he led the league in scoring with 53 goals and 85 points in 44 games. The next season, Rousseau moved on with the Hull-Ottawa Canadiens. Rousseau helped the team reach the 1957 Memorial Cup finals where they would play against the Guelph Biltmore Mad Hatters. The Canadiens took their opponents to a game 7 where they lost 3–2. This would not deter the Canadiens as they returned to the Memorial Cup again in 1957-58. Rousseau and his team won the Memorial Cup this time as they beat the Regina Pats in 6 games.

In 1960, Rousseau was loaned to the Kitchener-Waterloo Dutchmen, the team that would represent Team Canada, at the 1960 Winter Olympics in Squaw Valley. Canada would finish with a silver medal at the tournament, while the USA won gold and the Soviets took the bronze. Rousseau scored 5 goals, 4 of which came in a 19–1 victory over Japan, and 9 points in 7 games during Canada's Olympic run.

NHL career
In 1960-61, Rousseau earned his first chance in the National Hockey League with the Montreal Canadiens. Rousseau played in 15 games earning 3 points with the Canadiens. His style of play earned him a full spot on the roster with the Canadiens next season. He scored 21 goals and had 45 points during his first full NHL season, and was awarded the Calder Memorial Trophy as top rookie in the NHL that year. After winning the Calder, Rousseau had a less productive year as he scored 37 points only. In 1963-64, Rousseau scored 25 goals and had 56 points. Rousseau also had a 5-goal game against the Detroit Red Wings on February 1, 1964. The Canadiens reached the Stanley Cup Finals in 1964-65 against the Chicago Black Hawks. The series would go to 7 games, where the Canadiens would emerge victorious, giving Rousseau his first Stanley Cup win. Rousseau was also invited to the 1965 All-Star Game. During the 1965-66 NHL season, Rousseau  registered 78 points and tied with Stan Mikita for second overall in the scoring race. His hard work earned him a spot on the NHL Second All-Star Team that season. Rousseau would help the Canadiens defend their Stanley Cup title as they beat the Detroit Red Wings in 6 games. The Canadiens would return to the Finals for a third straight time in 1966-67. However, Rousseau and his team could not accomplish the three-peat as they were beaten by the Toronto Maple Leafs in 6 games. This did not matter to the Canadiens and Rousseau, as they made the finals for the next 2 seasons, winning the Stanley Cup both times.

After 9 seasons, with the Canadiens, and following a 24-goal performance the previous season, Rousseau was traded to the Minnesota North Stars where he spent the 1970-71 season. After just one season with the North Stars, he was traded to the New York Rangers in exchange for right winger Bob Nevin. Rousseau helped the Rangers reach the Stanley Cup Finals in 1971-72. Rousseau had a total of 17 points during the Rangers' run as they lost the Stanley Cup in 6 games to the Boston Bruins. After playing 2 more seasons with the Rangers, Rousseau retired after playing 8 games in 1974-75.

Personal life
Rousseau is the brother of former NHL players Rollie and Guy Rousseau.

Awards and achievements
Memorial Cup champion — 1958 (with the Hull-Ottawa Canadiens)
EPHL Second All-Star Team — 1961
Calder Memorial Trophy — 1962
NHL All-Star Games — 1965, 1967, 1969
NHL Second All-Star Team — 1966
Stanley Cup champion — 1965, 1966, 1968, 1969 (with the Montreal Canadiens)
On February 1, 1964, Rousseau scored 5 goals in one game and became one of 44 players in the NHL to score 5 or more goals in one game.

Career statistics

Regular season and playoffs

International

See also
 List of players with 5 or more goals in an NHL game

References

External links

1940 births
Living people
Calder Trophy winners
Canadian ice hockey right wingers
Ice hockey people from Montreal
Ice hockey players at the 1960 Winter Olympics
Medalists at the 1960 Winter Olympics
Minnesota North Stars players
Montreal Canadiens players
New York Rangers players
Olympic ice hockey players of Canada
Olympic medalists in ice hockey
Olympic silver medalists for Canada
Rochester Americans players
Stanley Cup champions